Altar is a municipality in Sonora in north-western Mexico. The municipality had a 2010 census population of 9,049 inhabitants, the vast majority of whom lived in the municipal seat of Altar, which had a population of 7,927 inhabitants. There are no other localities with over 1,000 inhabitants.

Surrounding municipalities are Sáric, Tubutama, Atil, Trincheras, Pitiquito, Caborca and Oquitoa.  The northern boundary is with Pima County in the U.S. state of Arizona.

The total area of the municipality (urban and rural) is 3,944.90 square kilometers.  The municipal population in 2010 was 9,049 inhabitants, with 7,927 (87.6%) living in the municipal seat.  Other settlements are La Cabecera Municipal, Ejido 16 de Septiembre, Ejido Llano Blanco, and Ejido Santa Matilde.

The territory of the municipality was originally inhabited by the O'odham people.  It was founded in 1775 by Captain Bernardo de Urrea, as a military fort, being called  Santa Gertrudis del Altar and later Nuestra Señora de Guadalupe del Altar.

The land lies at an elevation of  sloping towards the Gulf of California.  The climate is dry with extremely high temperatures in the summer.  The temperatures sometimes exceed  and is among the hottest places in the world from May to September.

The economy is based on agriculture and cattle raising.  The main crops are wheat, cotton, corn, beans, sorghum, and table grapes. The town is also a staging area for the flow of immigrants that will attempt entry into the United States through the shared Sonoran Desert.

Towns and villages

The largest localities (cities, towns, and villages) are:

Adjacent municipalities and counties
 Sáric Municipality - northeast
 Tubutama Municipality - east
 Atil Municipality - southeast
 Oquitoa Municipality - southeast
 Trincheras Municipality - south
 Pitiquito Municipality - southwest
 Caborca Municipality - west
 Pima County, Arizona - north

References

Municipalities of Sonora
1775 establishments in New Spain